The 2016–17 season was Antalyaspor's 51st year in existence. In addition to the domestic league, Antalyaspor participated in the Turkish Cup.

Competitions

Süper Lig

League table

Results summary

Results by matchday

Matches

Turkish Cup

References

External links 
  

Antalyaspor seasons
Turkish football clubs 2016–17 season